Trinity Schools are private Christian schools in the United States providing a classical Christian education to students in grades 7–12.  They were founded by the People of Praise and are independent schools owned and operated by Trinity Schools, Inc.  Jon Balsbaugh serves as President of all the schools.

Locations
Trinity Schools are currently located in three places:

Greenlawn, in South Bend, Indiana.
Meadow View, in Falls Church, Virginia.
River Ridge, in Eagan, Minnesota.

Trinity Member Schools
Wilberforce School (Princeton Junction, New Jersey)
Trinity Academy (Portland, Oregon)

In 2014, Trinity entered a partnership with the Wilberforce School to allow the later to license Trinity's upper school curriculum for its new high school and receive ongoing teacher training.  This partnership named Wilberforce the first Trinity Member School. Trinity Schools' second member school affiliate was Trinity Academy in Portland, Oregon.

Curriculum

Trinity Schools takes a classical education approach. Students are taught the Latin Language for the first four years, and have the choice of either Spanish, French, German, or New Testament Greek for their junior and senior years.  They are taught rigorous math courses for all six years.  Students take Drama in their junior and senior years, and perform for the school.  Students are taught music theory via recorder and keyboard in 7th grade, then in 8th grade participate in a recorder ensemble.  In 9th and 10th, Music is choral singing, culminating in public concerts.  They study Scripture for four years, and study the doctrine of their own denomination for one year.  In high school, they take a daily class for two hours called Humane Letters.  In Humane Letters, students study history, literature, philosophy and poetry.

Views on sexuality

The schools teach that sexual activity is only proper between a lawfully-wedded couple, and that marriage is only between a man and a woman. The schools insist that their students are not allowed to discuss their sexuality, and finds it unwise for teenagers to interpret same-sex attractions as identity-defining. The schools have been accused of discriminating against LGBTQ people, effectively barring admission to children of same-sex parents and making it clear that openly gay and lesbian teachers are not welcome.

Notable people
United States Supreme Court Justice Amy Coney Barrett served on the board of the organization from July 2015 to March 2017.

References

External links
 Trinity Schools

 
Christian schools in the United States
Classical Christian schools
People of Praise